The Visual Effects Society Award for Outstanding Compositing in a Photoreal Feature is one of the annual awards given by the Visual Effects Society, starting in 2012. It is awarded to visual effects artists for their work in effects simulations.

Winners & Nominees

2010s
Outstanding FX and Simulation Animation in a Live Action Feature Motion Picture

Outstanding Effects Simulations in a Photoreal/Live Action Feature Motion Picture

Outstanding Compositing in a Photoreal Feature

2020s

Superlatives

Films with Multiple Nominations

2 Nominations
 Avengers: Infinity War
 Life of Pi
 San Andreas
 Star Wars: The Last Jedi

External links
 Visual Effects Society

References

S
Awards established in 2002